The Maasai mythology or Maasai religion are the traditional beliefs of the Maasai people of Kenya and Tanzania. In Maasai culture, nature and its elements are important facets of their religion. Ngai (also called Engai or Enkai) is the androgynous Supreme Creator, possessing both masculine and feminine principles. The Maasai  refer to Ngai's primordial dwelling as "Ol Doinyo Lengai" which literally means "The Mountain of God" , which they believe is in Northern Tanzania.

Ngai or Enkai's name is synonymous to "rain."

In Maasai religion, the Laibon (plural: Laiboni) intercedes between the world of the living and the Creator.  They are the Maasai's high priests and diviners.  In addition to organizing and presiding over religious ceremonies—including sacrifice and libation, they also heal the living, physically and spiritually.

References

Further reading
 Harold Scheub, A Dictionary of African Mythology, The Mythmaker as Storyteller Oxford University Press, Oxford, 2000, 
 Naomi Kipury, Oral Literature of the Maasai (1983: East African Educational Publishers Ltd., PO Box 45314 Nairobi, Kenya
 Spencer, Paul, (2003), "Providence and the cosmology of misfortune" and "Loonkidongi diviners and Prophets", in Spencer, P, Time, Space, and the Unknown: Maasai configurations of power and providence, Routledge, London (pp. 67–123).